Jesús Eleazar Silva Izaguirre (born June 26, 1993, in Hermosillo, Sonora) is a professional Mexican footballer who currently plays for Cimarrones de Sonora Premier.

References

1993 births
Living people
Footballers from Sonora
Sportspeople from Hermosillo
Association footballers not categorized by position
21st-century Mexican people
Mexican footballers